Shaji (Malayalam: ഷാജി | Arabic: شاجي | Hindi: शाजी) is a common south Indian male given name. The most probable etymology is from Old Persian Shah (شاه) "king" and the Hindi honorific suffix ji (जी). Hence "Shah" + "Ji". Notable people with this name include:
 Shaji Chen, Indian writer and actor
 Shaji Choudary, Indian actor
 Shaji Kailas, Indian film director
 Shaji Kumar, Indian cinematographer
 Shaji N Karun, Indian film director
 Shaji P. Chaly, High Court Judge
 Shaji Prabhakaran, Senior Consultant for Asian Football Confederation and FIFA